The GP-4 is an experimental aircraft designed to fly cross country with two passengers  at . Aircraft Spruce & Specialty Co has the rights to distribute the kits for the aircraft, while the plans are distributed by Osprey Aircraft.

Design and development
The GP-4 is the fourth aircraft from designer George Pereira, It is a low wing side-by-side retractable gear aircraft of wood construction. It has a single spar stressed to +8 to -6G loading.

The aircraft's wooden construction is labor-intensive and an estimated 3000–4000 hours are required to construct it.

Operational history
In 1984, the GP-4 won the Grand Champion Custom Built and the Outstanding New Design awards at the Experimental Aircraft Association Airventure airshow in Oshkosh, Wisconsin.

Specifications GP-4

See also

References

Homebuilt aircraft
GP-4
Single-engined tractor aircraft
Low-wing aircraft
1980s United States sport aircraft
Aircraft first flown in 1984